Buster Valdemar Vitalis Sjöberg  (born April 1999) is a Canadian professional soccer player who plays for Vancouver Whitecaps FC in the MLS Next Pro. He played college soccer for Syracuse University.

Playing career
Sjöberg was born to Kjell and Katarina Sjoberg in Uppsala, Sweden and attended Celsiusskolan school. He played for IK Sirius's youth teams and Gamla Upsala SK.

College
During his freshman year in 2019, Sjöberg played for Wofford College and started in all 26 of his appearances. After two season he transferred to Syracuse and across two seasons with the Orange, Sjöberg started in 34 games out of 36 total appearances.

At the end of the 2022 season, he was part of the 2022 Syracuse Orange men's soccer team that won NCAA National Championship.

Semi-pro clubs
Sjöberg played for SC United Bantams of USL League Two in 2021 and One Knoxville SC in 2022, winning the Southern Division with both teams.

Vancouver Whitecaps FC 
Sjöberg was selected by the Vancouver Whitecaps FC as the 71st overall pick in the 2023 MLS SuperDraft.

Honours
Syracuse University
 Atlantic Division regular season: 2022
 ACC men's soccer tournament: 2022
 NCAA Division I men's soccer tournament: 2022

Individual
 2022: Academic All-District Team
 2021: All-ACC Academic Team
 2020: Southern Conference All-Academic Team, All-Southern Conference First Team, Southern Conference Academic Honor Roll
 2019: Southern Conference All-Freshman Team and All-Southern Conference Second Team, Southern Conference Academic Honor Roll

References

External links
 Syracuse bio

1999 births
Living people
Footballers from Uppsala
Swedish expatriate footballers
Association football defenders
One Knoxville SC players
SC United Bantams players
Syracuse Orange men's soccer players
USL League Two players
Vancouver Whitecaps FC draft picks
Martin J. Whitman School of Management alumni
Swedish footballers
Wofford Terriers men's soccer players